Laura Ries is a co-founder, with her father Al Ries, of Ries & Ries,  an advertising/marketing strategy consultancy firm. She has also written several books in the field of Marketing.

Career
Laura Ries is an advertising and branding consultant at Ries & Ries since 1994. Her title at Ries & Ries is president. She has also been a television personality and has been invited to be a commentator on contemporary branding news for television   and written publications. In 2008, the Atlanta Business Chronicle named Laura in their annual top 40 under 40 list.

Books
Works by Laura Ries with Al Ries, published by HarperCollins:
 22 Immutable Laws of Branding (1998) 
 11 Immutable Laws of Internet Branding (2000) 
 The Fall of Advertising and the Rise of PR (2002) 
 The Origin of Brands (2004) 
Other works by Laura Ries:
 Visual Hammer (2015) 
 Battlecry (2015)

References

External links
 Ries & Ries consulting firm
 Laura Ries' "Ries' Pieces" Branding Blog

Year of birth missing (living people)
Living people
Northwestern University alumni
American business writers
Women business writers
American economics writers
Marketing people
Marketing theorists
20th-century American women writers
20th-century American non-fiction writers
21st-century American women writers
American women non-fiction writers
21st-century American non-fiction writers